The M1 Abrams is a third-generation American main battle tank designed by Chrysler Defense (now General Dynamics Land Systems) and named for General Creighton Abrams. Initial models of the M1 were armed with a 105 mm M68 gun, while later variants feature a license-produced Rheinmetall 120 mm L/44.

The M1 Abrams was developed from the failure of the MBT-70 project to replace the obsolescent M60 tank. There are three main operational Abrams versions, the M1, M1A1, and M1A2, with each new iteration seeing improvements in armament, protection, and electronics.

The Abrams was to be replaced in U.S. Army service by the XM1202 Mounted Combat System, but since that project was cancelled, the Army has opted to continue maintaining and operating the M1 series for the foreseeable future by upgrading with improved optics, armor, and firepower.

The M1 Abrams entered service in 1980 and serves as the main battle tank of the United States Army and formerly of the United States Marine Corps (USMC). The export version is used by the armies of Egypt, Kuwait, Saudi Arabia, Australia, Poland and Iraq. The Abrams was first used in combat in the Persian Gulf War and has seen combat in both the War in Afghanistan and Iraq War under U.S. service, while Iraqi Abrams tanks have seen action in the war against Islamic State and have seen use by Saudi Arabia during the Yemeni Civil War.

History

Previous developments

Through the 1960s the US Army and West German Army had collaborated on a single design that would replace both the M60 tank and the Leopard 1. The overall goal was to have a single new design with improved firepower to handle new Soviet tanks like the T-62, while providing improved protection against the T-62's new 115 mm smoothbore gun and especially high-explosive anti-tank (HEAT) rounds.

The resulting design, the MBT-70, incorporated new technologies across the board. A hydropneumatic suspension provided improved cross-country ride quality and also allowed the entire tank to be raised or lowered by the driver. New  engines powered the designs which could both reach . The American version used a 152 mm gun whose primary long-range weapon was the Shillelagh missile.

While the design was highly capable, its weight continued to grow, as did its budget. By 1969, the unit cost stood at five times the original estimates, causing the Department of Defense to suspend the program. Development of the tank continued on an austere basis until January 1970, when the DoD and Germany ended their partnership.

The U.S. Army began work on an austere version of the MBT-70 called the XM803. The Army's changes were insufficient to allay concerns about the tank's cost. Congress canceled the XM803 in December 1971 but permitted the Army to reallocate remaining funds to develop a new main battle tank.

Starting afresh
The Army began the XM815 project in January 1972. The Main Battle Tank Task Force was established under Major General William Desobry. The task force prepared design studies with the technical support of Tank-automotive and Armaments Command (TACOM).

In spring 1962, Desobry was briefed by the British on their own newly developed [Chobham armour|"Burlington" armor]] from the British Army's labs. The armor performed exceptionally against shaped charges such as high-explosive anti-tank (HEAT) rounds. In September, Desobry convinced the Army to incorporate the new armor. In order to take full advantage of Burlington, also known as Chobham, the new tank would have to have armor around two feet thick (for comparison, the armor on the M60 is around four inches thick). The original goal of keeping weight under  was abandoned.

The XM1 program was approved to begin in January 1973. TACOM began examining specific goals. After several rounds of input, the decision was made to provide armor to defeat the "heavy threat" posed by the T-62's 115 mm gun using projected improvements of their armour-piercing fin-stabilized discarding sabot (APFSDS) ammunition through the 1980s, and the new 125 mm gun of the T-64 and T-72 firing high-explosive anti-tank (HEAT) rounds. To this end, a new design basis emerged in February 1973. It had to defeat any hit from a Soviet gun within 800 meters and 30 degrees to either side. The tank would be armed with the 105 mm M68 gun, a licensed version of the Royal Ordnance L7, and a 20 mm version of the M242 Bushmaster. The Army later deleted the latter from the design, seeing it as superfluous.

In May 1973, Chrysler Defense and General Motors submitted proposals. Both were armed with the 105 mm M68 gun, the licensed L7, and the 20 mm Bushmaster. Chrysler chose a 1,500 hp gas turbine Lycoming AGT1500. GM's model was powered by a 1,500 hp diesel similar to that used on the American MBT-70 and XM803.

At the time, the Pentagon's procurement system was beset with problems being caused by the desire to have the best possible design. This often resulted in programs being canceled due to cost overruns, leaving the forces with outdated systems, as was the case with the MBT-70. There was a strong movement within the Army to get a new design within budget to prevent the MBT-70 experience from repeating itself. For the new design, the Army stated the unit cost was to be no more than $507,000 in 1972 dollars.

The Pentagon's approach to control of research and development was modified with the XM1. Previous acquisition strategy called for a significant amount of the design work be done by the government. Under the new framework, contractors would competitively bid their own designs rather than compete solely for the right to manufacture the end product.

More changes

Through the period while the initial prototypes were being built, a debate broke out between Germany and US about the use of the 105 mm gun. The Army was planning on introducing several new types of ammunition for the 105 that would greatly improve its performance, notably, the XM-774 using depleted uranium. These rounds would give it the performance needed to defeat any Soviet tank with ease. There was some concern that depleted uranium would not be allowed in Germany, perhaps just in peacetime, so improvements to the tungsten cored M735 were also considered.

Through this same period, there was an ongoing effort to improve NATO logistics by standardizing ammunition to the maximum possible degree. The Germans were moving ahead with their 120 mm gun on the Leopard 2K, and noted that the British had also introduced a 120 mm gun of their own in keeping with their long-range combat doctrine.

By 1977 the decision had been made to eventually move the new tank to a 120 mm gun. After head-to-head testing between the Royal Ordnance L11A5 and the Rh-120, the latter was chosen and later type-classified as the M256. The turret designs of the two prototypes were modified to allow either gun to be fitted. Although the L11/M256 120mm gun was chosen to be the main weapon of the Abrams in 1979, the improved ammunition for the gun still was not fully developed, thus delaying its fielding until 1984.

The early production versions of the M1 Abrams (M1 & IPM1) were armed with the M68A1 for two reasons. First was due to the large number of M60 tanks with the M68E1 gun still in widespread US service in the 1980s and a large on-hand stockpile of 105mm munitions. Fitting the M1 with the M68A1 gun was viewed as an economical and practical solution that allowed for commonality in ammunition among the two types of tanks.  Secondly was that the M68A1 could employ the newly developed M900 APFSDS depleted uranium round that had improved penetration performance in comparison to the M774.

Prototypes

Prototypes were delivered in 1976 by Chrysler and GM armed with the M68E1 105 mm gun. They entered head-to-head testing at Aberdeen Proving Ground, along with a Leopard 2 AV prototype for comparison. The Leopard 2 was found to meet U.S. requirements but was thought to cost more. The testing showed that the GM design was generally superior to Chrysler's, offering better armor protection, and better fire control and turret stabilization systems. These early preproduction prototypes were provisionally armed with the M68E1 105mm main gun while a preferred 120 mm gun and its ammunition were in their design and component development phase. These prototypes used a combination mount that allowed for evaluating both 105 mm and 120 mm guns.

During testing, the power packs of both designs proved to have issues. The Chrysler gas turbine engine had extensive heat recovery systems in an attempt to improve its fuel efficiency to something similar to a traditional internal combustion engine. This proved not to be the case: the engine consumed much more fuel than expected, burning . The GM design used a new variable-compression diesel design.

By spring 1976, the decision to choose the GM design was largely complete. In addition to offering better overall performance, there were concerns about Chrysler's engine both from a reliability and fuel consumption standpoint. The GM program was also slightly cheaper overall at $208 million compared to $221 million for Chrysler. In July 1976, the Army prepared to inform Congress of the decision to move ahead with the GM design. All that was required was the final sign-off by the Secretary of Defense, Donald Rumsfeld.

Chrysler is chosen 

On 20 July 1976, United States Secretary of the Army Martin Hoffmann and a group of generals visited Deputy Defense Secretary Bill Clements and Director of Defense Research and Engineering Malcolm Currie on their decision. They were surprised when Clements and Currie criticized their decision and demanded the turbine be selected. Donald Rumsfeld heard arguments from both in the afternoon. The Army team spent the night writing briefs and presented them to Rumsfeld the next morning, who then announced a four-month delay.

Within days, GM was asked to present a new design with a turbine engine. According to Assistant Secretary for Research and Development Ed Miller, "It became increasingly clear that the only solution which would be acceptable to Clements and Currie was the turbine... It was a political decision that was reached, and for all intents and purposes that decision gave the award to Chrysler since they were the only contractor with a gas turbine."

On 12 November 1976, the Defense Department awarded a $20 billion development contract to Chrysler.

The turbine engine does not appear to be the only reason for this decision. Chrysler was the only company that appeared to be seriously interested in tank development; the M60 had been lucrative for the company and relied on that program for much of its profit. In contrast, GM made only about 1% of its income from military sales, compared to 5% for Chrysler, and only submitted their bid after a "special plea" from the Pentagon.

Production starts

In January 1978, a program was initiated to develop an enhanced version of the 105mm gun, the M68A1 as a possible alternate weapon for the M1 Abrams. The new XM24/L55 gun barrel was 18 inches (45.72 cm) longer in comparison to the XM24/L52 barrel used on the M60 tanks. It has a higher chamber pressure, reinforced breech and a higher muzzle velocity.

Low rate initial production (LRIP) of the vehicle was approved on 7 May 1979. In February 1982, General Dynamics Land Systems Division (GDLS) purchased Chrysler Defense, after Chrysler built over 1,000 M1s.

A total of 3,273 M1 Abrams tanks were produced during 1979–1985 and first entered U.S. Army service in 1980. Production at the government-owned, GDLS-operated Lima Army Tank Plant in Lima, Ohio, was joined by vehicles built at the Detroit Arsenal Tank Plant in Warren, Michigan from 1982 to 1996. The U.S. Army Laboratory Command (LABCOM), under the supervision of the United States Army Research Laboratory (ARL), was also heavily involved with designing the tank with M1A1 armor resistant shells, M829A2 armor-penetrating rounds, and improved weapon range.

The M1 was armed with the license-built M68A1 version of the 105 mm Royal Ordnance L7 gun. The tank featured the first of its kind Chobham armor. The M1 Abrams was the first to use this advanced armor. It consisted of an arrangement of metal plates, ceramic blocks and open space. An improved model called the M1IP was produced briefly in 1984 and contained upgrades to armour and other small improvements. The M1IP models were used in the Canadian Army Trophy NATO tank gunnery competition in 1985 and 1987.

About 5,000 M1A1 Abrams tanks were produced from 1986 to 1992 and featured the M256  smoothbore cannon developed by Rheinmetall AG of Germany for the Leopard 2, improved armor, consisting of depleted uranium and other classified materials, and a CBRN protection system. Production of M1 and M1A1 tanks totaled some 9,000 tanks at a cost of approximately $4.3 million per unit.

In 1990, Project On Government Oversight in a report criticized the M1's high costs and low fuel efficiency in comparison with other tanks of similar power and effectiveness such as the Leopard 2.

As the Abrams entered service, they operated alongside M60A3 within the U.S. military, and with other NATO tanks in various Cold War exercises which usually took place in Western Europe, especially West Germany. The exercises were aimed at countering Soviet forces.

Adaptations before the Persian Gulf War (Operations Desert Shield and Desert Storm) gave the vehicle better firepower and NBC (Nuclear, Biological and Chemical) protection.

Persian Gulf War

The Abrams remained untested in combat until the Persian Gulf War in 1991, during Operation Desert Storm. A total of 1,848 M1A1s were deployed to Saudi Arabia to participate in the liberation of Kuwait. The M1A1 was superior to Iraq's Soviet-era T-54/T-55 and T-62 tanks, as well as T-72 versions imported from the Soviet Union and Poland. Polish officials stated that no license-produced T-72 (nicknamed Lion of Babylon) tanks were finished before destruction of the Iraqi Taji tank plant in 1991.

The T-72s, like most Soviet export designs, lacked night-vision systems and then-modern rangefinders, though they did have some night-fighting tanks with older active infrared systems or floodlights. Very few M1 tanks were hit by enemy fire and none were destroyed as a direct result of enemy fire, none of which resulted in any fatalities. Three Abrams were left behind the enemy lines after a swift attack on Talil airfield, south of Nasiriyah, on February 27. One of them was hit by enemy fire, the two other embedded in mud. The tanks were destroyed by U.S. forces in order to prevent any trophy-claim by the Iraqi Army. A total of 23 M1A1s were damaged or destroyed during the war. Of the nine Abrams tanks destroyed, seven were destroyed by friendly fire and two intentionally destroyed to prevent capture by the Iraqi Army. Some others took minor combat damage, with little effect on their operational readiness.

This meant Abrams tanks could hit Iraqi tanks before the enemy got in range—a decisive advantage in this kind of combat. In friendly fire incidents, the front armor and fore side turret armor survived direct armor-piercing fin-stabilized discarding sabot (APFSDS) hits from other M1A1s. This was not the case for the side armor of the hull and the rear armor of the turret, as both areas were penetrated on at least two occasions by unintentional strikes by depleted uranium ammunition during the Battle of Norfolk.

During operations Desert Shield and Desert Storm some M1IP and M1A1s were modified locally in theater (in the war zone) by modification work orders (MWO) with additional rolled homogeneous armor plating welded on the turret front.

Lessons from the war improved the tank's weapons sights and fire control unit.

Waco siege

During the Waco siege in 1993 two M1A1 Abrams tanks were deployed by the FBI against the Branch Davidians.

Upgrades
The M1A2 was a further improvement of the M1A1, with a commander's independent thermal viewer, weapon station, position navigation equipment, and a full set of controls and displays linked by a digital data bus. These upgrades also provided the M1A2 with an improved fire control system. The M1A2 System Enhancement Package (SEP) added digital maps, Force XXI Battle Command Brigade and Below (FBCB2) Linux communications system capabilities for commanders, and an improved cooling system to compensate for heat generated by the additional computer systems.

The M1A2 SEP also serves as the basis for the M104 Wolverine heavy assault bridge. The M1A2 SEPv2 (version 2) added Common Remotely Operated Weapon Station (CROWS or CROWS II) support, color displays, better interfaces, a new operating system, better front and side armor, and an upgraded transmission for better durability.

Further upgrades included depleted uranium armor for all variants, a system overhaul that returns all A1s to like-new condition (M1A1 AIM), a digital enhancement package for the A1 (M1A1D), and a commonality program to standardize parts between the U.S. Army and the Marine Corps (M1A1HC). Improvements to survivability, lethality, and protection have been sought since 2014.

Iraq War

Further combat was seen during 2003 when U.S. forces invaded Iraq and deposed Iraqi President Saddam Hussein in the Iraq War's Operation Iraqi Freedom. During the invasion, at least nine Abrams tanks were put out of action by fire from rocket-propelled grenades.

This was in the face of inadequately trained Iraqi tank crews, most of whom had not fired live ammunition in the previous year due to the sanctions then in operation and made no hits at point-blank range.

Following lessons learned in Desert Storm, the Abrams and many other U.S. combat vehicles used in the conflict were fitted with Combat Identification Panels to reduce friendly fire incidents.

Several Abrams tanks that were irrecoverable due to loss of mobility or other circumstances were destroyed by friendly forces, usually by other Abrams tanks, to prevent their capture. Some Abrams tanks were disabled by Iraqi infantrymen in ambushes during the invasion. Some troops employed short-range anti-tank rockets and fired at the tracks, rear and top. Other tanks were put out of action by engine fires when flammable fuel stored externally in turret racks was hit by small arms fire and spilled into the engine compartment. By March 2005, approximately 80 Abrams tanks were forced out of action by enemy attacks; 63 were shipped back to the U.S. for repairs, while 17 were damaged beyond repair with 3 of them at the beginning of 2003.

Vulnerabilities exposed during urban combat in the Iraq War were addressed with the Tank Urban Survival Kit (TUSK) modifications, including armor upgrades and a gun shield, issued to some M1 Abrams tanks. It added protection in the rear and side of the tank and improved fighting ability and survival ability in urban environments. By December 2006 more than 530 Abrams tanks had been shipped back to the U.S. for repairs.

In May 2008, it was reported that a U.S. M1 tank had also been damaged in Iraq by insurgent fire of a Soviet-made RPG-29 "Vampir", which uses a tandem-charge high-explosive anti-tank warhead to penetrate explosive reactive armor (ERA) as well as composite armor behind it. The U.S. considered the RPG-29 a high threat to armor and refused to allow the newly formed Iraqi Army to buy it, fearing that it would fall into the insurgents' hands.

Iraqi Army service
Between 2010 and 2012 the U.S. supplied 140 refurbished M1A1 Abrams tanks to Iraq. In mid-2014, they saw action when the Islamic State of Iraq and the Levant launched the June 2014 Northern Iraq offensive. During three months, about one-third of the Iraqi Army's M1 tanks had been damaged or destroyed by ISIL and some were captured by opposing forces. By December 2014, the Iraqi Army only had about 40 operational Abrams left. That month, the U.S. Department of State approved the sale of another 175 Abrams to Iraq.

Iranian-backed Iraqi Shiite Kata'ib Hezbollah (Hezbollah Brigades) were reported to operate M1 Abrams, and released publicity showing the tanks being transported by trucks to take part in the Battle of Mosul. It is not known whether the tanks were captured from ISIS, seized from Iraq's military, or handed over.

One Iraqi-operated Abrams has been nicknamed "The Beast" after it became the lone working tank when taking back the town of Hit in April 2016, destroying enemy fighting positions and IED emplacements.

In October 2017, Abrams were used by the Iraqi security forces and the Popular Mobilization Forces (also called Al-Hashd al-Shaabi) in assaults against the Kurdistan Regional Government Peshmerga in the town of Altun Kupri (also called Prde). It was claimed by Kurdish commanders that at least one Abrams was destroyed by the Peshmerga.

War in Afghanistan
Tanks may have limited utility in Afghanistan due to the mountainous terrain, although Canada and Denmark deployed Leopard 1 and 2 MBTs that were specially modified to operate in the relatively flat and arid conditions of southwestern Afghanistan. In late 2010, at the request of Regional Command Southwest, the U.S. Marine Corps deployed a small detachment of 14 M1A1 Abrams tanks from Delta Company, 1st Tank Battalion, 1st Marine Division (Forward), to southern Afghanistan in support of operations in Helmand and Kandahar provinces.

2015 Yemen Civil War
After the start of the Saudi Arabian intervention in Yemen during the 2015 Yemeni Civil War, Saudi Arabian M1A2 MBTs were deployed near the Saudi Arabian/Yemeni border. In August 2016, the U.S. approved a deal to sell up to 153 more Abrams tanks to Saudi Arabia, including 20 "battle damage replacements", suggesting that some Saudi Arabian Abrams had been destroyed or severely damaged in combat in Yemen.

2022 Russian invasion of Ukraine 
On 24 January 2023, U.S. President Joe Biden said that the US would send 31 M1 Abrams tanks to Ukraine, stating that this was intended to "enhance the Ukraine’s capacity to defend its territory and achieve its strategic objectives" and was "not an offensive threat to Russia."  The plan to transfer the tanks to Ukraine was approved as part of a larger support package. Pentagon spokesperson Sabrina Singh specified that the tanks would be the M1A2 variant; however, because they were not available in excess in U.S. stocks, they would be purchased through Ukraine Security Assistance Initiative (USAI) and would likely take months to deliver.  She also acknowledged the challenges of training Ukrainian tank crews and maintaining the tanks in Ukraine.

Production shutdown

The U.S. Army planned to end production at the Lima Army Tank Plant from 2013 to 2016 in an effort to save over $1 billion; it would be restarted in 2017 to upgrade existing tanks. General Dynamics Land Systems (GDLS), which operates the factory, opposed the move, arguing that suspension of operations would increase long-term costs and reduce flexibility. Specifically, GDLS estimated that closing the plant would cost $380 million and restarting production would cost $1.3 billion.

By August 2013, Congress had allocated $181 million for buying parts and upgrading Abrams systems to mitigate industrial base risks and sustain development and production capability. Congress and General Dynamics were criticized for redirecting money to keep production lines open and accused of "forcing the Army to buy tanks it didn't need." General Dynamics asserted that a four-year shutdown would cost $1.1–1.6 billion to reopen the line, depending on the length of the shutdown, whether machinery would be kept operating, and whether the plant's components would be completely removed.

They contended that the move was to upgrade Army National Guard units to expand a "pure fleet" and maintain production of identified "irreplaceable" subcomponents. A prolonged shutdown could cause their makers to lose their ability to produce them and foreign tank sales were not guaranteed to keep production lines open. There is still risk of production gaps even with production extended through 2015. With funds awarded before recapitalization is needed, budgetary pressures may push planned new upgrades for the Abrams from 2017 to 2019.

In December 2014, Congress again allocated $120 million, against the wishes of the Army, for Abrams upgrades including improving gas mileage by integrating an auxiliary power unit (APU) to decrease idle time fuel consumption and upgrading the tank's sights and sensors.

In late 2016, tank production and refurbishment had fallen to a rate of one per month with fewer than 100 workers on site. In 2017, the Trump administration ordered military production to increase, including Abrams production and employment. In 2018, it was reported that the Army had ordered 135 tanks re-built to new standards, with employment at over 500 workers and expected to rise to 1,000.

Future plans

During the 1980s and 1990s, the Block III main battle tank from the Armored Systems Modernization (ASM) program was expected to succeed the M1 Abrams family in the 1990s. The design had an unmanned turret with a 140 mm main gun, as well as improved protection. The end of Cold War hostilities caused the end of the program. The tracked M8 Armored Gun System was conceived as a possible supplement for the Abrams in U.S. service for low-intensity conflict in the early 1990s. Prototypes were made but the program was canceled. The eight-wheeled M1128 Mobile Gun System was designed to supplement the Abrams in U.S. service for low-intensity conflicts. It has been introduced into service and serves with Stryker brigades.

The Future Combat Systems XM1202 Mounted Combat System was to replace the Abrams in U.S. Army service and was in development when funding for the program was cut from the DoD's budget in 2010.

Engineering Change Proposal 1 is a two-part upgrade process. ECP1A adds space, weight, and power improvements and active protection against improvised explosive devices. Nine ECP1A prototypes have been produced as of October 2014. ECP1B, which will begin development in 2015, may include sensor upgrades and the convergence of several tank round capabilities into a multi-purpose round.

In 2011 the Army anticipated that the remaining M1A1 fleet will remain in U.S. service until at least 2021, and the M1A2 to beyond 2050. The United States Army National Guard will continue using M1A1s for a lengthier, undetermined period.

The Marine Corps pursued a force restructuring plan named Force Design 2030. Under this program, all US Marine tank battalions were deactivated and its M1A1 tanks transferred to the Army by the end of 2021.

The U.S. Army is evaluating a replacement for the M1 Abrams as part of the Next Generation Combat Vehicle (NGCV) program, notionally known as the Decisive Lethality Platform (DLP).

Design

Countermeasures

Camouflage

Earlier U.S. military vehicles, used from World War I through the Vietnam War, used a scheme of "olive drab", often with large white stars. Prototypes, early production M1 (105 mm gun) and M1-IP models switched to a flat forest green paint scheme. The large white insignia stars have also transitioned to much smaller black markings. Some units painted their M1s with the older Mobility Equipment Research and Design Command (MERDC) 4-color paint scheme but the turn-in requirements for these tanks required repainting them to overall forest green. Therefore, even though a large number of the base model M1s were camouflaged in the field, few or none exist today.

M1A1s came from the factory with the NATO three color camouflage Black/Med-Green/Dark-Brown Chemical Agent Resistant Coating (CARC) paint jobs. Today, M1A1s are given the NATO three color paint job during rebuilds. M1s and M1A1s deployed to Operation Desert Storm were hastily painted desert tan. Some, but not all, of these tanks were re-painted to their "authorized" paint scheme. M1A2s built for Middle Eastern countries were painted in desert tan. Replacement parts (roadwheels, armor skirt panels, drive sprockets, etc.) are painted olive green, which can sometimes lead to vehicles with a patchwork of green and desert tan parts.

Australian M1A1s were desert tan when delivered but have undergone a transition to the Australian Army vehicle standard 'Disruptive Pattern Camouflage'; a scheme that consists of black, olive drab, and brown.

The U.S. Army can equip its Abrams tanks with the Saab Barracuda camouflage system, which provides concealment against visual, infrared, thermal infrared, and broad-band radar detection.

Concealment
The turret is fitted with two six-barreled M250 smoke grenade launchers (USMC M1A1s used an eight-barreled version), with one on each side. When deployed, the grenades airburst, creating a thick smoke that blocks both visual and thermal imaging. The engine is also equipped with a smoke generator that is triggered by the driver. When activated, fuel is sprayed into the hot turbine exhaust, creating the thick smoke. Due to a risk of fires however, this system is sometimes disabled.

Armor

In July 1973, representatives from Chrysler and General Motors traveled to the United Kingdom, and were escorted by personnel from the Ballistic Research Laboratory and XM1 Project Manager Major General Robert J. Baer to witness the progress of British developed Chobham armor. They observed the manufacturing processes required for the production of Chobham armor, which was an arrangement of metal plates, ceramic blocks and open space; and saw a proposed design for a new British vehicle utilizing it.

HEAT and sabot rounds enter the beginning layers of armor but are unable to penetrate the crew compartment. Ceramics have the ability to absorb a great deal of heat, and can blunt physical blows by cracking and deflecting the force. The remaining hot gasses and metal shrapnel spread out or settle in empty air pockets. Both contractors reevaluated their proposed armor configurations based upon the newly obtained data.

This led to major changes in the General Motors XM1, the most prominent of which is the turret front changing from vertical to sloped armor. The Chrysler XM1 on the other hand retained its basic shape although a number of changes were made. The Ballistic Research Laboratory had to develop new armor combinations in order to accommodate the changes made by the contractors.

Similar to most other main battle tanks, the M1 Abrams feature composite armor only on the frontal aspect of the hull. However, the Abrams' turret features composite armoring across both the front and the sides. In addition, the side skirts of the frontal half of the hull are also made of composite, providing superior ballistic protection against chemical energy munitions such as HEAT rounds. The composition of the Abrams' composite armor consists of sandwiched plates of non-explosive reactive armor (NERA) between conventional steel plates. The NERA plates feature elasticity, allowing them to flex and distort upon perforation, disrupting the penetrating jets of shaped charges and providing more material and space for a kinetic round to pass through, thus providing increased protection compared to conventional steel armor of similar weight. For the M1 Abrams base model, Steven Zaloga estimates the frontal armor at 350 mm vs armor-piercing fin-stabilized discarding sabot (APFSDS) and 700 mm vs high-explosive anti-tank (HEAT) warhead in the book, M1 Abrams Main Battle Tank 1982–1992 (1993). In M1 Abrams vs T-72 Ural (2009), he uses Soviet estimates of 470 mm vs APFSDS and 650 mm vs HEAT for the base model Abrams. He also gives the Soviet estimates for the M1A1, 600 mm vs APFSDS, and 700 mm vs HEAT.

Armor protection was improved by implementing a new special armor incorporating depleted uranium and other undisclosed materials and layouts. This was introduced into the M1A1 production starting October 1988. This new armor increased effective armor particularly against kinetic energy rounds but at the expense of adding considerable weight to the tank, as depleted uranium is 1.7 times denser than lead.

The first M1A1 tanks to receive this upgrade were tanks stationed in Germany. US-based tank battalions participating in Operation Desert Storm received an emergency program to upgrade their tanks with depleted uranium armor immediately before the onset of the campaign. M1A2 tanks uniformly incorporate depleted uranium armor, and all M1A1 tanks in active service have been upgraded to this standard as well. This variant was designated as the M1A1HA (HA for Heavy Armor).

The M1A1 AIM, M1A2 SEP and all subsequent Abrams models feature depleted uranium in both the hull and turret armor. Each Abrams variant after the M1A1 have been equipped with depleted uranium armor of different generations. The M1A1HA uses first generation armor, while the M1A2 and M1A1HC use second generation depleted uranium. The M1A2 SEP variants have been equipped with third generation depleted uranium armor combined with a graphite coating. The M1A2C also features increased physical line-of-sight turret armor.

For the M1A1HA, Zaloga gives a frontal armor estimate of 600 mm vs APFSDS and 1300 mm vs HEAT in M1 Abrams Main Battle Tank 1982–1992, nearly double the original protection of the Abrams. In M1 Abrams vs T-72 Ural, he uses different estimates of 600 mm vs APFSDS and 700 mm vs HEAT for the front hull and 800 mm vs APFSDS and 1300 mm vs HEAT for the front of the turret. The protection of M1A2 SEP is a frontal turret armor estimate of 940–960 mm vs APFSDS and 1,320–1,620 vs HEAT, glacis estimate of 560–590 mm vs APFSDS and 510–1,050 vs HEAT, and lower front hull estimate of 580–650 mm vs APFSDS and 800–970 vs HEAT. The M1A2 SEPV3 increased the LOS thickness of the turret and hull front armor; total armor protection from this increase is not known.

In 1998, a program was begun to incorporate improved turret side armor into the M1A2. This was intended to offer better protection against rocket-propelled grenades more modern than the baseline RPG-7. These kits were installed on about 325 older M1A2 tanks in 2001-2009 and it was also included in upgraded tanks.

The Abrams may also be fitted with explosive reactive armor over the track skirts if needed (such as the Tank Urban Survival Kit) and slat armor over the rear of the tank and rear fuel cells to protect against ATGMs. Protection against spalling is provided by a kevlar liner.

Damage control
The tank has a halon firefighting system to automatically extinguish fires in the crew compartment. The engine compartment has a firefighting system that is engaged by pulling a T-handle located on the left side of the hull. The Halon gas can be dangerous to the crew. However, the toxicity of Halon 1301 gas at 7% concentration is much lower than the combustion products produced by fire in the crew compartment, and CO2 dump would be lethal to the crew.

The crew compartment also contains small hand-held fire extinguishers. Fuel and ammunition are stored in armored compartments with blowout panels intended to protect the crew from the risk of the tank's own ammunition cooking off (exploding) if the tank is damaged. The main gun's ammunition is stored in the rear section of the turret, with blast doors that open under power by sliding sideways only to remove a round for firing, then automatically close. Doctrine mandates that the ammunition door must be closed before arming the main gun.

Tank Urban Survival Kit

The Tank Urban Survival Kit (TUSK) is a series of improvements to the M1 Abrams intended to improve fighting ability in urban environments. Historically, urban and other close battlefields have been poor places for tanks to fight. A tank's front armor is much stronger than that on the sides, top, or rear. In an urban environment, attacks can come from any direction, and attackers can get close enough to reliably hit weak points in the tank's armor or gain sufficient elevation to hit the top armor.

Armor upgrades include reactive armor on the sides of the tank and slat armor (similar to that on the Stryker) on the rear to protect against rocket-propelled grenades and other shaped charge warheads. A Transparent Armor Gun Shield and a thermal sight system are added to the loader's top-mounted M240B 7.62 mm machine gun, and a Kongsberg Gruppen Remote Weapon Turret carrying a 12.7 mm (.50 in) caliber machine gun (again similar to that used on the Stryker) is in place of the tank commander's original 12.7 mm (.50 in) caliber machine gun mount, wherein the commander had to expose himself to fire the weapon manually. An exterior telephone allows supporting infantry to communicate with the tank commander.

The TUSK system is a field-installable kit that allows tanks to be upgraded without needing to be recalled to a maintenance depot. While the reactive armor may not be needed in most situations, like those present in maneuver warfare, items like the rear slat armor, loader's gun shield, infantry phone (which saw use on Marine Corps M1A1s as early as 2003), and Kongsberg Remote Weapons Station for the 12.7 mm (.50 in) caliber machine gun will eventually be added to the entire M1A2 fleet.

In August 2006, General Dynamics Land Systems received a U.S. Army order for 505 Tank Urban Survivability Kits (TUSK) for Abrams main battle tanks supporting operations in Iraq, under a US$45 million contract. Deliveries were expected to be completed by April 2009. Under a separate order, the U.S. Army awarded General Dynamics Armament and Technical Products (GDATP) US$30 million to produce reactive armor kits to equip M1A2s. The reactive tiles for the M1 will be locally produced at GDATP's Burlington Technology Center.

Tiles will be produced at the company's reactive armor facility in Stone County Operations, McHenry, Mississippi. In December 2006, the U.S. Army added Counter Improvised Explosive Device enhancements to the M1A1 and M1A2 TUSK, awarding GDLS $11.3 million contract, part of the $59 million package mentioned above. In December, GDLS also received an order, amounting to around 40% of a US$48 million order, for loader's thermal weapon sights being part of the TUSK system improvements for the M1A1 and M1A2 Abrams Tanks.

Active protection system

In addition to the armor, some USMC Abrams tanks were equipped with a Softkill Active protection system, the AN/VLQ-6 Missile Countermeasure Device (MCD) that can impede the function of guidance systems of some semi-active control line-of-sight (SACLOS) wire- and radio guided anti-tank missiles (such as the Russian 9K114 Shturm) and infrared homing missiles. The MCD works by emitting a massive, condensed infrared signal to confuse the infrared homing seeker of an anti-tank guided missile (ATGM).

However, the drawback to the system is that the ATGM is not destroyed, it is merely directed away from its intended target, leaving the missile to detonate elsewhere. This device is mounted on the turret roof in front of the loader's hatch, and can lead some people to mistake Abrams tanks fitted with these devices for the M1A2 version, since the Commander's Independent Thermal Viewer on the latter is mounted in the same place, though the MCD is box-shaped and fixed in place as opposed to cylindrical and rotating like the CITV.

In 2016, the U.S. Army and Marine Corps began testing out the Israeli Trophy active protection system to protect their Abrams tanks from modern RPG and ATGM threats by either jamming (with ATGMs) or firing small rounds to deflect incoming projectiles. The Army planned to field a brigade of over 80 tanks equipped with Trophy to Europe in 2020. It is planned for up to 261 Abrams to be upgraded with the system, enough for four brigades. In June 2018, the Army awarded Leonardo DRS, U.S. partner to Trophy's designer Rafael, a $193 million contract to deliver the system in support of M1 Abrams "immediate operational requirements". U.S. Army M1A2 SEP V2 Abrams tanks deployed to Germany in July 2020 fitted with Trophy systems. Deliveries to equip four tank brigades were completed in January 2021.

Armament

Primary

M68A1 rifled gun
The main armament of the original model M1 and M1IP was the M68A1 105 mm rifled tank gun firing a variety of armor-piercing fin-stabilized discarding sabot, high-explosive anti-tank, high explosive, white phosphorus rounds and an anti-personnel (multiple flechette) round. This gun used a license-made tube of the British Royal Ordnance L7 gun together with the vertical sliding breech block and other parts of the U.S. T254E2 prototype gun. However, it proved to be inadequate; a cannon with lethality beyond the  range was needed to combat newer armor technologies. To attain that lethality, the projectile diameter needed to be increased. The tank was able to carry 55 105 mm rounds, with 44 stored in the turret blow-out compartment and the rest in hull stowage.

M256 smoothbore gun

The main armament of the M1A1 and M1A2 is the M256A1 120 mm smoothbore gun, designed by Rheinmetall AG of Germany, manufactured under license in the U.S. by Watervliet Arsenal, New York. The M256A1 is an improved variant of the Rheinmetall 120 mm L/44 gun carried on the German Leopard 2 on all variants up to the Leopard 2A5, the difference being in thickness and chamber pressure. Leopard 2A6 replaced the L/44 barrel with a longer L/55. Due to the increased caliber, only 40 or 42 rounds are able to be stored depending on if the tank is an A1 or A2 model.
 Elevation: −9 to +20 degree

The M256A1 fires a variety of rounds. The primary APFSDS round of the Abrams is the depleted uranium M829 round, of which four variants have been designed. M829A1, known as the "Silver Bullet", saw widespread service in the Gulf War, where it proved itself against Iraqi armor such as the T-72. The M829A2 APFSDS round was developed specifically as an immediate solution to address the improved protection of a Russian T-72, T-80U or T-90 main battle tank equipped with Kontakt-5 explosive reactive armor (ERA).

Later, the M829A3 round was introduced to improve its effectiveness against next generation ERA equipped tanks, through usage of a multi-material penetrator and increased penetrator diameter that can resist the shear effect of K-5 type ERA. Development of the M829 series is continuing with the M829A4 currently entering production, featuring advanced technology such as data-link capability.

The Abrams also fires high-explosive anti-tank warhead shaped charge rounds such as the M830, the latest version of which (M830A1) incorporates a sophisticated multi-mode electronic sensing fuse and more fragmentation that allows it to be used effectively against armored vehicles, personnel, and low-flying aircraft. The Abrams uses a manual loader, who also provides additional support for maintenance, observation post/listening post (OP/LP) operations, and other tasks.

The new M1028 120 mm anti-personnel canister cartridge was brought into service early for use in the aftermath of the 2003 invasion of Iraq. The tungsten balls can be used to clear enemy dismounts, break up hasty ambush sites in urban areas, clear defiles, stop infantry attacks and counter-attacks and support friendly infantry assaults by providing covering fire.

Also in use is the M908 obstacle-reduction round. It is designed to destroy obstacles and barriers. The round is a modified M830A1 with the front fuse replaced by a steel nose to penetrate into the obstacle before detonation.

The U.S. Army Research Laboratory (ARL) conducted a thermal analysis of the M256 from 2002 to 2003 to evaluate the potential of using a hybrid barrel system that would allow for multiple weapon systems such as the XM1111 Mid-Range munition, airburst rounds, or XM 1147. The test concluded that mesh density (number of elements per unit area) impacts accuracy of the M256 and specific densities would be needed for each weapon system.

In 2013 the Army was developing a new round to replace the M830/M830A1, M1028, and M908. Called the Advanced Multi-Purpose (AMP) round, it will have point detonation, delay, and airburst modes through an ammunition data-link and a multi-mode, programmable fuse in a single munition. Having one round that does the job of four would simplify logistics and be able to be used on a variety of targets. The AMP is to be effective against bunkers, infantry, light armor, and obstacles out to 500 meters, and will be able to breach reinforced concrete walls and defeat ATGM teams from 500 to 2,000 meters. Orbital ATK was awarded a contract to begin the first phase of development for the AMP XM1147 High-Explosive Multi-Purpose with Tracer cartridge in October 2015.

In addition to these, the XM1111 (Mid-Range-Munition Chemical Energy) was also in development. The XM1111 was a guided munition using a dual-mode seeker that combined imaging-infrared and semi-active laser guidance. The MRM-CE was selected over the competing MRM-KE, which used a rocket-assisted kinetic energy penetrator. The CE variant was chosen due to its better effects against secondary targets, providing a more versatile weapon. The Army hoped to achieve IOC with the XM1111 by 2013. However, the Mid-Range Munition was cancelled in 2009 along with Future Combat Systems.

Secondary

The Abrams tank has three machine guns, with an optional fourth:
 A .50 cal. (12.7 mm) M2HB machine gun in front of the commander's hatch. On the M1 and M1A1, this gun is mounted on the Commander's Weapons Station. This allows the weapon to be aimed and fired from within the tank. Normal combat loadout for the M1A1 is a single 100-round box of ammo at the weapon, and another 900 rounds carried.  The later M1A2 variant had a "flex" mount that required the tank commander to expose his or her upper torso in order to fire the weapon. In urban environments in Iraq this was found to be unsafe. With the Common Remote Operated Weapons System (CROWS) add-on kit, an M2A1 .50 Caliber Machine gun, M240, or M249 SAW can be mounted on a CROWS remote weapons platform (similar to the Protector M151 remote weapon station used on the Stryker family of vehicles). Current variants of the Tank Urban Survival Kit (TUSK) on the M1A2 have forgone this, instead adding transparent gun shields to the commander's weapon station. The upgrade variant called the M1A1 Abrams Integrated Management (AIM) equips the .50 caliber gun with a thermal sight for accurate night and other low-visibility shooting.
 A 7.62 mm M240 machine gun in front of the loader's hatch on a skate mount (seen at right). Some of these were fitted with gun shields during the Iraq War, as well as night-vision scopes for low-visibility engagements and firing. This gun can be moved to the TC's position if the M2 .50 cal is damaged.
 A second 7.62 mm M240 machine gun in a coaxial mount (i.e., it points at the same targets as the main gun) to the right of the main gun. The coaxial MG is aimed and fired with the same computerized firing control system used for the main gun. On earlier M1 and M1A1s 3000 rounds are carried, all linked together and ready to fire. This was reduced slightly in later models to make room for new system electronics. A typical 7.62mm combat loadout is between 10,000 and 14,000 rounds carried on each tank.
 (Optional) A second coaxial .50 cal. (12.7 mm) M2HB machine gun can be mounted directly above the main gun in a remote weapons platform as part of the CSAMM (Counter Sniper Anti Material Mount) package.

Aiming

The Abrams is equipped with a ballistic fire-control computer that uses user and system-supplied data from a variety of sources to compute, display, and incorporate the three components of a ballistic solution—lead angle, ammunition type, and range to the target—to accurately fire the main gun. These three components are determined using a laser rangefinder, crosswind sensor, a pendulum static cant sensor, data concerning performance and flight characteristics of each specific type of round, tank-specific boresight alignment data, ammunition temperature, air temperature, barometric pressure, a muzzle reference system (MRS) that determines and compensates for barrel drop at the muzzle due to gravitational pull and barrel heating due to firing or sunlight, and target speed determined by tracking rate tachometers in the Gunner's or Commander's Controls Handles.

All of these factors are computed into a ballistic solution and updated 30 times per second. The updated solution is displayed in the Gunner's or Tank Commander's field of view in the form of a reticle in both day and Thermal modes. The ballistic computer manipulates the turret and a complex arrangement of mirrors so that all one has to do is keep the reticle on the target and fire to achieve a hit. Proper lead and gun tube elevation are applied to the turret by the computer, greatly simplifying the job of the gunner.

The fire-control system uses this data to compute a firing solution for the gunner. The ballistic solution generated ensures a hit percentage greater than 95 percent at nominal ranges. Either the commander or gunner can fire the main gun. Additionally, the Commander's Independent Thermal Viewer (CITV) on the M1A2 can be used to locate targets and pass them on for the gunner to engage while the commander scans for new targets.

If the primary sight system malfunctions or is damaged, the main and coaxial weapons can be manually aimed using a telescopic scope boresighted to the main gun known as the Gunner's Auxiliary Sight (GAS). The GAS has two interchangeable reticles; one for high-explosive anti-tank (HEAT) and multi-purpose anti-tank (MPAT) ammunition and one for armor-piercing fin-stabilized discarding sabot (APFSDS) and Smart Target-Activated Fire and Forget (STAFF) ammunition. Turret traverse and main gun elevation can be performed with manual handles and cranks if the fire control or hydraulic systems fail.

The commander's M2HB .50 caliber machine gun on the M1 and M1A1 is aimed by a 3× magnification sight incorporated into the Commander's Weapon Station (CWS), while the M1A2 uses the machine gun's own iron sights, or a remote aiming system such as the Common Remotely Operated Weapon Station (CROWS) system when used as part of the Tank Urban Survival Kit. The loader's M240 machine gun is aimed either with the built-in iron sights or with a thermal scope mounted on the machine gun.

In late 2017, the 400 USMC M1A1 Abrams were to be upgraded with better and longer-range sights on the Abrams Integrated Display and Targeting System (AIDATS) replacing the black-and-white camera view with a color sight and day/night thermal sight, simplified handling with a single set of controls, and a slew to cue button that repositions the turret with one command. Preliminary testing showed the upgrades reduced target engagement time from six seconds to three by allowing the commander and gunner to work more closely and collaborate better on target acquisition.

Mobility

Tactical

However, damage to the drivetrain (especially to the tracks) and an increased risk of injuries to the crew can occur at speeds above .

The tank was built around this engine and it is multifuel-capable, including diesel, gasoline, marine diesel and jet fuel (such as JP-4 or JP-8). In the AGT1500, jet fuel has poorer fuel economy and operating range compared to diesel. By 1989, the Army was transitioning solely to JP-8 for the M1 Abrams, part of a plan to reduce the service's logistics burden by using a single fuel for aviation and ground vehicles. However  the U.S. Army frequently refuels the Abrams with diesel, which is also used by the Bradley Fighting Vehicle. The Australian M1A1 AIM SA burns diesel fuel, since the use of JP-8 is less common in the Australian Army.

The gas turbine propulsion system has proven quite reliable in practice and combat, but its high fuel consumption is a serious logistic problem.

The high-speed, high-temperature jet blast emitted from the rear of M1 Abrams tanks makes it hazardous for infantry to take cover or follow behind the tank in urban combat. The turbine is very quiet when compared to diesel engines of similar power output and produces sound significantly different from a contemporary diesel tank engine, reducing the audible distance of the sound, thus earning the Abrams the nickname "whispering death" during its first Reforger exercise.

The Army received proposals, including two diesel options, to provide the common engine for the XM2001 Crusader and Abrams. In 2000, the Army selected the gas turbine engine LV100-5 from Honeywell and subcontractor General Electric. The new LV100-5 engine was lighter and smaller (43% fewer parts) with rapid acceleration, quieter running, and no visible exhaust. It also featured a 33% reduction in fuel consumption (50% less when idle) and near drop-in replacement. The Common Engine Program was shelved when the Crusader program was canceled. Phase 2 of Army's PROSE (Partnership for Reduced O&S Costs, Engine) program, however, called for further development of the LV100-5 and replacement of the current AGT1500 engine.

It uses a high power density  Wankel rotary engine modified to use diesel and military grade jet fuel. The new APU will also be more fuel efficient than the tank's main engine. Testing of the first APUs began in 2009.

Although the M1 tank is not designed to carry riders easily, provisions exist for the Abrams to transport troops in tank desant with the turret stabilization device switched off. A battle equipped infantry squad may ride on the rear of the tank, behind the turret. The soldiers can use ropes and equipment straps to provide handholds and snap links to secure themselves. If enemy contact is made the tank conceals itself, allowing the infantry to dismount.

Strategic

Strategic mobility is the ability of the tanks of an armed force to arrive in a timely, cost effective, and synchronized fashion. The Abrams can be carried by a C-5 Galaxy or a C-17 Globemaster III. The limited capacity (two combat-ready tanks in a C-5, one combat-ready tank in a C-17) caused serious logistical problems when deploying the tanks for the first Persian Gulf War, though there was enough time for 1,848 tanks to be transported by ship.

The Marines transported their Marine Air-Ground Task Force Abrams tanks by combat ship. A Wasp-class Landing Helicopter Dock (LHD) typically carried a platoon of four to five tanks attached to the deployed Marine Expeditionary Unit, which were then amphibiously transported to shore by Landing Craft Air Cushion (LCAC) at one combat-ready tank per landing craft.

The Abrams is also transportable by truck, namely the Oshkosh M1070 and M1000 Heavy Equipment Transporter System (HETS) for the US Military. The HETS can operate on highways, secondary roads, and cross-country. It accommodates the four tank crew members. The Australian Army uses customised MAN trucks to transport its Abrams.

The first instance of the Abrams being airlifted directly into a battlefield occurred in October 1993.  Following the Battle of Mogadishu, 18 M1 tanks were airlifted by C-5 aircraft to Somalia from Hunter Army Airfield, Georgia.

Variants and upgrades 

 XM1-FSED: Preproduction test model. Eleven Full-Scale Engineering Development test bed vehicles were produced in 1977–78. These vehicles were also called Pilot Vehicles and numbered PV-1 through PV-11.
 M1: First production variant. Production began (at Chrysler) in 1979 and continued to 1985 (at General Dynamics) (3,273 built for the US). The first 110 tanks were low rate initial production (LRIP) models, still called XM1s, because they were built before the tank being type-classified as the M1.
 M1IP (Improved Performance): Produced briefly in 1984 before the M1A1, contained upgrades and reconfigurations like new turret with thicker frontal armor, new turret is referred as long turret instead of older short turret, armor upgraded from ~650mm line of sight thickness to ~880mm (894 built for US).
 : Production started in 1985 and continued to 1992, pressurized NBC system, rear bustle rack for improved stowage of supplies and crew belongings, redesigned blow-off panels and M256 120 mm smoothbore cannon (4,976 built for the U.S. Army, 221 for USMC, 59 M1A1 AIM SA sold to Australia).
M1A1HA (Heavy Armor): Added first generation depleted uranium armor components. Some tanks were later upgraded with second generation depleted uranium armor components, and are unofficially designated M1A1HA+.
 M1A1HC (Heavy Common): Added new second generation depleted uranium armor components, digital engine control and other small upgrades common between Army and Marine Corps tanks.
 M1A1D (Digital): A digital upgrade for the M1A1HC, to keep up with M1A2 SEP, manufactured in quantity for only 2 battalions.
 M1A1 AIM v.1 (Abrams Integrated Management): A program whereby older units are reconditioned to zero hour conditions; and the tank is improved by adding Forward-Looking Infra-Red (FLIR) and Far Target Locate sensors, a tank-infantry phone, communications gear, including FBCB2 and Blue Force Tracking to aid in crew situational awareness, and a thermal sight for the .50 caliber machine gun.
 M1A1 AIM v.2/M1A1SA (Situational Awareness): Upgrades similar to AIM v.1 tanks + new third generation depleted uranium armor components. Configuration for the Royal Moroccan Army, which is almost identical to the Australian variant, except exportable turret armor is installed by General Dynamics Land System to replace the DU armor.
 M1A1 FEP (Firepower Enhancement Package): Similar upgrade to AIM v.2 for USMC tanks.
 M1A1KVT (Krasnovian Variant Tank): M1A1s that have been visually modified to resemble Soviet-made tanks for use at the National Training Center, fitted with MILES gear and a Hoffman device.
 M1A1M: An export variant ordered by the Iraqi Army.
M1A1 (AIDATS upgrade): Upgrade-only variant to all USMC General Dynamics M1A1 Abrams tanks to improve the tank commander's situational awareness with an upgraded thermal sight, color day camera, and a stationary color display.
  (Baseline): Production began in 1992 and initial operating capability achieved in 1993. (77 built for the U.S. and more than 600 M1s upgraded to M1A2, 315 for Saudi Arabia, 1,005 for Egypt, 218 for Kuwait). The M1A2 offers the tank commander an independent thermal sight and ability to, in rapid sequence, shoot at two targets without the need to acquire each one sequentially, also second generation depleted uranium armor components.
M1A2 SEP (System Enhancement Package): Is fitted with new, second-generation gunner's thermal sight. Has upgraded third-generation depleted uranium armor components with graphite coating (240 new built, 300 M1A2s upgraded to M1A2 SEP for the US, also unknown numbers of upgraded basic M1s and M1IPs, also 400 oldest M1A1s upgraded to M1A2 SEP).
 M1A2S (Saudi Package): Saudi Arabian variant upgrade of the M1A2 based on M1A2 SEP, with some features, such as depleted uranium armor, believed to be missing and replaced by special armor. (442 M1A2s upgraded to M1A2S).
 M1A2 SEPv2: Added Common Remotely Operated Weapon Station as standard, color displays, improved interfaces, a new operating system, improved front and side armor with ERA (TUSK kit), tank-infantry phone as standard, and an upgraded transmission for better durability.
 M1A2 SEPv3 (formerly M1A2C): Has increased power generation and distribution, better communications and networking, new Vehicle Health Management System (VHMS) and Line Replaceable Modules (LRMs) for improved maintenance, an Ammunition DataLink (ADL) to use airburst rounds, improved counter-IED armor package, improved FLIR using long- and mid-wave infrared, a low-profile CROWS RWS, Next Generation Armor Package (NGAP), and an Auxiliary Power Unit (APU) under armor to run electronics while stationary instead of the engine, visually distinguishing the version by a small exhaust at the left rear. More passive ballistic protection added to the turret faces, along with new Explosive Reactive Armor mountings (Abrams Reactive Armor Tile (ARAT)) and Trophy Active Protection systems added to the turret sides.  Prototypes began testing in 2015, and the first were delivered in October 2017. The first unit received them in July 2020.
 M1A2T: Special configuration variant of the M1A2 SEPv3 reportedly being offered for sale to Taiwan as of March 2019 and approved by US State Department as of July 2019. Per DSCA statement, it is roughly equivalent to M1A2 SEPv3, except depleted uranium armor is replaced by FMS export armor. There is no mention of the Trophy APS system. The new-built tanks will be produced at Anniston Army Depot, Anniston, Alabama, and the Joint Systems Manufacturing Center, Lima, Ohio.
 M1A2 SEPv4 (formerly M1A2D): The US Army Thunderhorse 2-12 Cavalry Regiment has received the first M1A2 SEPv4 tank . It was previously under development . The Commander's Primary Sight, also known as the Commander's Independent Thermal Viewer, and Gunner's Primary Sight will be upgraded with third Gen FLIR, an improved laser rangefinder and color cameras. Additional improvements will include advanced meteorological sensors, laser warning/detection receivers, directional smoke grenade launchers and integration of the new  (AMP) 120mm tank round. The AN/VVR-4 laser warning receiver and ROSY rapid obscurant system have been trialed by the US Army for adoption on the Abrams tank and Bradley fighting vehicle.
 M1A2-K: Under development, unique variant for the Kuwaiti Army, slated to replace Kuwait's current M1A2 fleet.

 Tank Test Bed (TTB) Prototype TACOM project begun in 1983 with unmanned turret, three crew members in armored capsule in front of the heavy armored hull, main armament was 120 mm smoothbore gun M256, mechanical loading system under turret.
 Component Advanced Technology Test Bed (CATTB) was an experimental model with a XM291 140 mm smoothbore cannon, heavy armored turret and upgraded hull based on the Abrams chassis. It had a mechanical loading system in turret bustle, a new engine and other upgrades, never fielded. The tank went into trials in 1987–88.

AbramsX is a technology demonstrator of the M1 Abrams series by General Dynamics Land Systems. The AbramsX features an autoloader, unmanned turret (which reduces the crew to 3), a hybrid diesel-electric power pack that gives 50% more fuel efficiency, a 30mm chain gun in a remote weapon station, active protection systems, augmented reality that would increase the crew's awareness thanks to cameras and sensors mounted around the tank's exterior, a silent mode when running on electric power, the ability to be updated more easily than existing tanks, the ability to utilize loitering munitions such as the AeroVironment Switchblade as well as surveillance drones, and reduced weight for improved mobility. In October 2022, GDLS released a video showing the Technology Demonstrator and various technology tests.

Specialized

 RV90 Armored Recovery Vehicle: A prototype designed by General Dynamics was produced in 1988 and evaluated against the M88A1E1 later that year. The Army selected the M88A1E1, which went into production as the M88A2 Hercules.
 M1 Grizzly Combat Mobility Vehicle (CMV).
 M1 Panther II: A remote controlled mine clearing vehicle with turret removed, mine rollers on front, and the Standardized Teleoperation System.
 M104 Wolverine Heavy Assault Bridge
 M1074 Joint Assault Bridge (JAB): Bridgelayer combining a heavy "scissor" bridge with the M1 Abrams chassis. Expected to reach low-rate initial production in 2019 to replace the M60 AVLB and M104 Wolverine.
Battle Command Vehicle: The vehicle was visually modified to with a mock M256 gun to appear like an ordinary Abrams MBT, but featured communications equipment and workstations for battle commanders. United Defense LP constructed a prototype which the Army tested at Fort Hood in 1997.

 M1150 Assault Breacher Vehicle (ABV): Assault variant for the USMC. Based upon the M1A1 Abrams chassis, the Assault Breacher Vehicle has a variety of systems installed, such as a full-width mine plow, two linear demolition charges, and a lane-marking system. Reactive armor has been fitted to the vehicle providing additional protection against High-explosive anti-tank warhead-based weapons. The turret has been replaced by a new smaller one with two MICLIC launchers at its rear. A M2HB .50 machine gun in a remote weapons station is mounted on the commander's cupola and a bank of grenade launchers are fitted to each side of the superstructure to cover the frontal arc for self-protection.
Additional equipment
M1A1 Mine Clearing Blade System (MCBS): (LIN B13228) It is electrically operated and is capable of clearing surface or buried mines up to 6 feet in front of the tank's path. The plough produces a windrow of soil that is filled with mines. This windrow must be reduced using a mine rake or by laying a MICLIC alongside the windrow and detonating it. The plough is also capable of pushing up berms, clearing trench-lines, and proofing lanes and staging areas. It can be adapted for use on the M60A1 MBT.
Self Protection Combat Roller (SPCR): (LIN M53112) The Self Protection Combat Roller (SPCR) exerts high pressure onto the ground ahead of the tracks of the host vehicle to target pressure activated explosive devices in order to actively prove routes. It is designed to operate on concrete, asphalt, gravel and hard dirt roads. The system comprises two 4-wheel roller gangs to protect the vehicle tracks which stow neatly to minimize its impact on vehicle operation ability and mobility when not in use. The rollers are able to steer left and right to provide a level of coverage during cornering. An optional Magnetic System Duplicator (MSD) can be fitted to help protect the equipment from the effect of magnetic influence fused mines.
Surface Clearance Device (SCD): (LIN B17484) The SCD is employed to clear surface laid mines and IEDs from roads, trails and rough terrain. There are two versions of the SCD; a V-blade optimised for clearing routes and a straight angle-blade which is optimised for clearing staging and assembly areas.
Vehicle Magnetic Signature Duplicator (VEMSID): (LIN V53112) The VEMSID increases the effectiveness and survivability of countermine equipment by causing the stand-off detonation of magnetic influence mines at a safe distance ahead of the tank.  It generates a multi-axial magnetic signature optimized for passively fused magnetic influence fused mines. The system comprises four emitter coils, two associated power boxes and an MSD Control Unit (MSDCU).
Air Ground Defense System (AGDS): Proposed air defense variant of the Abrams equipped with dual 35 mm Bushmaster III autocannons, 12 ADATS missiles and advanced electro-optical and radar targeting systems derived from the ADATS. It was supposed to be capable of both air defense and anti-tank purposes with the ADATS MIM-146 missiles which was a dual purpose ATGM/SAM. The proposal never saw consideration and was never developed further.

Specifications

Operators 

  – Australian Army: 59 M1A1 (AIM) configuration tanks (hybrids with a mix of equipment used by U.S. Army and U.S. Marine Corps but without depleted uranium layers in armor). These tanks were bought from the U.S. in 2006 and replaced the Leopard AS1 in 2007. As of 2017, the Australian Government was considering expanding the Army's fleet of Abrams to 90 tanks. In April 2021, the U.S. granted an FMS for 160 M1A1 tank hulls to produce 75 M1A2 SEPv3 Abrams Main Battle Tanks, 29 M1150 Assault Breacher Vehicles and 18 M1074 Joint Assault Bridges including the development of a unique armor package for the Australian Army. In January 2022, Australia committed to purchase 120 tanks and armored vehicles including 75 M1A2s at a total cost of $3.5 billion and to be delivered in 2024; the M1A2s are to replace their 59 M1A1s which were bought in 2007.
  – Egyptian Army: 1,360 M1A1 tanks assembled in Egypt for the Egyptian Army in cooperation with the U.S.
  – Iraqi Army: 321 M1A1Ms Iraq was leasing 22 U.S. Army M1A1s for training in 2008. The first 11 tanks were delivered to the Iraqi Army in August 2010 with all deliveries completed by August 2011. In October 2012, it was reported that six more tanks were being delivered. Zaloga wrote that four battalions of the 9th Armoured Division were equipped with M1s by 2014: 1st and 2nd of the 34th Brigade, and 4th and 5th of the 35th Brigade.
  – Kuwaiti Army: 218 M1A2s
  – Polish Land Forces: Poland has bought 250 new American M1 Abrams tanks in the newest M1A2 SEP v3 version. Production is set to finish by 2024, and delivery to early 2025. After donation of over 200 Polish T-72 tanks to Ukraine, an agreement between the Polish and American governments was signed to buy 116 ex-U.S. M1A1 Abrams tanks. Delivery is expected to start in 2022. 7 loaned training tanks have already been delivered to Poland as of July 2022. The total purchase cost with support vehicles, crew training, and large supply of ammunition will cost PLN 23.3 billion (approximately $6 billion). The Abrams tanks are to supplement 247 Leopard 2PL main battle tanks as well as older T-72 and PT-91 tanks. 28 tanks in variant SEPv2 were leased in July 2022 to tank crews until proper deliveries begin.
  – Saudi Arabian Army: 373 Abrams tanks, To be upgraded to M1A2S configuration in Saudi Arabia. 69 more M1A2S tanks ordered on 8 January 2013, to be delivered by 31 July 2014.
  – Royal Moroccan Army: 222 M1A1 SA (situational awareness) tanks ordered in 2015. Deliveries under the contract started in July 2016 with an estimated completion date of February 2018. The contract include 150 refurbished and upgraded tanks to the special armor configuration. Morocco took delivery of the first batch of M1A1SAs on 28 July 2016. A Foreign Military Sale for 162 M1A2Ms was approved by the U.S. Department of State in November 2018 and sent to Congress for final approval.
  – Republic of China Army: Taiwan was considering the purchase of upwards 200 M1 Abrams tanks, which was later reduced with the intention of acquiring 120 M1A1 tanks. The Ministry of National Defence stated in 2016 that it was in discussion with the U.S. about sales of M1A1s. This plan was apparently canceled by October 2017. Instead the Taiwanese government plans to upgrade its M60A3s in service with a 120 mm main gun, new ballistics computer, etc. In July 2018, Taiwan's Ministry of National Defense budgeted money to purchase 108 M1A2 tanks from the U.S. government, to replace its aging CM-11 Brave Tiger and M60A3 TTS battle tanks. The U.S. Department of State approved the $2.2 billion sale in July 2019. A sale of 108 M1A2T tanks was later finalized. The first two of these tanks were delivered to Taiwan in June 2022.
  – United States Army and United States Marine Corps received over 8,100 M1, M1A1 and M1A2 tanks combined.
 U.S. Army – 2,509 total, 750 M1A1SA, 1,605 M1A2 SEPv2, 154 M1A2 SEPv3 (some 3,700 more M1A1 and M1A2 in storage).

Future operators
  – Ukrainian Army: 31 M1 Abrams to be delivered at a unknown date, as part of U.S. support for Ukraine.
  – Romanian Land Forces: On 7 March 2023, a senior defence official announced that the Romanian Land Forces is in the process of advancing a proposal for the purchase of a Abrams tank battalion.

Former operators 
  – United States Marine Corps: In 2020 the Marine Corps announced the disbandment of its tank units, citing a pivot towards amphibious warfare by implementing Force Design 2030. All 450 of the Marine Corps M1 Abrams MBTs were transferred to the U.S. Army with withdrawal from Marine Corps service being completed in May 2021.

See also 

 List of the United States military vehicles by model number
 List of main battle tanks by country
 List of main battle tanks by generation
 Unmanned ground vehicle

References

Footnotes

Notes

Citations

Bibliography

 
 
 
 
 

 
 Practical Applications of Vehicle Control within the Distributed Processing Architecture, Proceedings of the 1992 American Control Conference, Ruggirello, Joseph A., Bielawski, Dennis A., and Diaz, R. Gary, General Dynamics, IEEE, Published Jun. 1992

External links 

Abrams U.S. Army Acquisition Support Center page - U.S. Army.
M1A2 Main Battle Tank  - General Dynamics Land Systems.
M1A2 Abrams Main Battle Tank - Military.com
M1A1/2 Abrams Main Battle Tank - Global Defense Technology.
M1 Abrams page - a detailed overview of how the tank works on howstuffworks.com
M1 Tank Urban Survivability Kit (TUSK), M1A1 AIM Upgrade, and M1A2 SEP Upgrade - Defense-Update.com
M1 Abrams modernization 2011, M1 Abrams modernization 2012 - Federation of American Scientists.
 AbramsX Technology Demonstrator on the Move, concept video for proposed next-generation Abrams tank with autonomous operation and a silent mode. October 2022.

Cold War tanks of the United States
Gas turbine vehicles
General Dynamics land vehicles
Main battle tanks of the Cold War
Main battle tanks of the United States
Military vehicles introduced in the 1980s